The following is a list of Yosemite waterfalls, including ephemeral falls:

  Alder Creek Falls 
 Bridalveil Fall 
 California Fall 
 Chilnualna Falls 
 Horsetail Fall 
 Illilouette Fall 
 Lehamite Falls 
 LeConte Falls 
 Nevada Fall 
 Pywiack Cascade 
 Quaking Aspen Falls 
 Ribbon Fall 
 Royal Arch Cascade 
 Sentinel Fall 
 Silver Strand Falls 
 Snow Creek Falls 
 Staircase Falls 
 Three Chute Falls 
 Tueeulala Falls 
 Tuolumne Fall 
 Vernal Fall 
 Wapama Falls 
 Waterwheel Falls 
 White Cascade 
 Wildcat Falls 
 Yosemite Falls

References

External links
 NPS.gov: Waterfalls in Yosemite National Park

Yosemite waterfalls
Yosemite
Yosemite